Gwelup Croatia is an Australian semi-professional soccer club based in Gwelup in Perth, Western Australia, founded in 1988. Gwelup Croatia currently competes in the Football West State League 1, with matches played at the Croatian Sporting Complex in Gwelup. They also compete in the  Metropolitan League, Masters League, Ladies League, and in Juniors teams. The club regularly competes in the Australian-Croatian Soccer Tournament.

In 2018 they qualified for the Round of 32 in the FFA Cup.

History

Founded in 1988 by Croatian immigrants, they won the Amateur Premier Division back to back in 2015 and 2016 before being promoted to the State League and winning Division 2 on their first attempt in 2017. The club won State League Division 1 in 2019 and were promoted to the NPLWA.

Current squad
As of 14 March 2020

Current coaching staff
 Mitchell Prentice – First Team Coach

Honours
 2019 Football West State League Division 1 Champions
 2018 Football West State Cup Finalist
 2017 Football West State League Division 2 Champions 2016 Amateur League Premier Division Champions 2015 Amateur League Premier Division Champions'''

See also
List of Croatian football clubs in Australia
Australian-Croatian Soccer Tournament
Croatian Australian

External links

 Gwelup CSC Facebook page

References

Soccer clubs in Perth, Western Australia
Football West State League teams
National Premier Leagues clubs
Croatian sports clubs in Australia
Association football clubs established in 1988
1988 establishments in Australia